Tom Neumann was a player in the American Football League for the Boston Patriots in 1963 as a halfback. He played at the collegiate level at Northern Michigan University and the University of Wisconsin–Madison.

Biography
Neumann was born on March 4, 1940, in Peshtigo, Wisconsin.

See also
New England Patriots players

References

Boston Patriots players
American football halfbacks
1940 births
Living people
People from Menomonie, Wisconsin
Players of American football from Wisconsin
Northern Michigan Wildcats football players
Wisconsin Badgers football players
American Football League players